K. Ali Kutty (born 1945), title Musliyar, is an Islamic scholar from Kerala, southern India. He currently serves as General Secretary, Samastha Kerala Jamiyyathul Ulama, the body of Sunni-Shafi'i scholars in northern Kerala.

He also serves as Principal, Jami'ya Nooriya Arabic College, Perinthalmanna (2003–present) and President, Ponnani Maunathul Islam Arabic College.

Life and career

K. Ali Kutty was born in 1945. He completed his Post Graduate degree in Islamic Studies from Jami'ya Nooriya Arabic College, Perinthalmanna in 1968 (Moulavi Fazil Faizi).

The musliyar was appointed as the qadi of the village of Thirurkad at the age of twenty (1965).

Career 

In 1970, K. Ali Kutty Musliyar was chosen as Perintalmanna Taluk General Secretary, Samastha Kerala Jamiyyathul Ulama and in 1976 as Malappuram District Joint Secretary of the Samastha. In 1986 he was inducted to the mushavara of the Samastha and in 1991 he was chosen as the General Secretary, Sunni Yuvajana Sangham (S. Y. S.). In 1979 the Musliyar started teaching at Jami'ya Nooriya (Arabic Literature till 1991 and the Fiqh from 1991) and was appointed as the Principal in 2003.

Musliyar currently serves as the General Secretary, Samastha Kerala Jamiyyathul Ulama.

Positions 

 Member, All India Muslim Personal Law Board (from 2008)
 Vice President, Sunni Mahallu Federation (S. M. F.)
 Vice President, Samastha Kerala Matha Vidyabhyasa Board (from 2009)
 Kasaragod Qadi (from 2013) 
 Member, International Fiqh Council, under Muslim World League
 Controller of Examinations, Coordination of Islamic Colleges (CIC-Wafy), Kerala
 General Secretary, Sunni Yuvajana Sangham (1992 - 2016)
 Khatib and Qadi, Thirurkad Mahallu (from 1965)

Educational institutions 

 President, Ponnani Maunathul Islam Arabic College (from 2000)
 Vice President, Kerala State Muslim Orphanage Coordination Committee (from 2004)
 General Secretary, Vettattoor Anvarul Huda Islamic Complex  
 Vice President, Thirurkad Anvarul Huda Islamic Complex 
 General Secretary, Anvarul Huda Islamic Complex
 General Manager, Anvarul Islam Institution, Thiroorkad, Kerala (from 1970)
 President, Vadakara Hujjathul Islam Arabic College (from 2005)

Chairman 

 Haj Committee of Kerala (2003 - 2006)
 Vice chairman, Haj Committee of India (2006–09)

Publications 

 Vice Chairman, Suprabhaatham daily (from 2014)
 Sunni Afkar (from 2005)
 Al-Muallim monthly (from 2009)
 Al-Noor monthly, in Arabic (from 2009)
 Muslim Lokam Year Book

Seminars

 International Islamic Seminar (1986, Hyderabad) - 'Solutions of Contemporary Problems According to Islamic Fiqh' (Libyan Embassy)
 National Seminar (1989, Hyderabad) - 'Re-structuring of Arabic & Persian Syllabi' (Central Institute of English & Foreign Language).
 Arabic Language and Literature Refresher Course (1998–99, Kerala) (University College)

References

1945 births
Living people
People from Malappuram district
Malayali people
Indian Islamic religious leaders
Indian Sunni Muslim scholars of Islam
Shafi'is
Islam in Kerala
Kerala Sunni-Shafi'i scholars